Boris Gyuderov (12 February 1927 – 23 May 2001) was a Bulgarian volleyball player. He competed in the men's tournament at the 1964 Summer Olympics. He also was part of the Bulgarian team in three World Championships and five European Championships. In 2019, he was posthumously inducted to the Volleyball Hall of Fame.

References

External links
 

1927 births
2001 deaths
Bulgarian men's volleyball players
Olympic volleyball players of Bulgaria
Volleyball players at the 1964 Summer Olympics
People from Pernik